Bartlett Bay is an Arctic waterway in the Qikiqtaaluk Region, Nunavut, Canada. It is in Nares Strait off eastern Ellesmere Island, off the Bache Peninsula. Victoria Head marks the northern tip of its mouth.

It is named in honor of Captain Robert Bartlett, a Newfoundland navigator and Arctic explorer.

Geography

Fauna
Muskox frequent the area.

References

Bays of Qikiqtaaluk Region
Ellesmere Island